A stoma is a pore, found in the epidermis of leaves, stems, and other organs, that facilitates gas exchange. 

Stoma may also refer to:

 Stoma (medicine), an opening which connects a portion of the body cavity to the outside environment
"Stoma", single by Welcome (band)
"Stoma", track on 2010 album The Age of Hell by Chimaira
"Stoma", track on 2015 soundtrack album Rosetta: Audio/Visual Original Score
Saulius Stoma, a Lithuanian politician
Sternberg Test of Mental Ability (STOMA), an intelligence test by Robert Sternberg

See also
Ad Stoma, a fort in the Roman province of Moesia

zh:保衛細胞